Abril Abdamari Garza Alonso (born February 28, 1998), better known as Ari Gameplays (stylized AriGameplays), is a Mexican Internet celebrity, streamer, YouTuber, TikToker, glamour model, and cosplayer. With 5.4 million, her Twitch channel is the 27th most-followed globally, and the third most-followed female streamer on the platform, as well as the 150th most-followed user on TikTok. She is also known as MiPriv creator.

Early life 
Garza was born in Ciudad Juárez, Chihuahua, but she was raised in Monterrey, Nuevo León. From an early age she became interested in video games, while studying communication sciences at the National Autonomous University of Mexico, from which she dropped out due to her success in social networks.

Career 
On July 23, 2014, Garza uploaded her first video to YouTube. Initially, she uploaded tutorials and content of female interest. She subsequently chose to dedicate herself to vlogs and Let's Plays. The video games with which she had the most reach on that platform were Minecraft, Grand Theft Auto V, Fortnite, Overwatch and Planet Coaster. Later on February 17, 2019, she started her secondary YouTube channel, which is active from time to time.

In 2016, she started streaming on Twitch, where she managed to position herself as the second most followed female streamer, with around 1.35 million. In June 2018 she participated in a Fortnite Battle Royale tournament hosted by El Rubius at Gamergy 2018. Between May 18 and 19, 2019 she was invited to the Mexican festival Open.GG. In September 2019, she was a luxury guest at The International 2019 Dota 2 tournament in La Paz, Bolivia. In September 2020, after suffering a ban on Twitch, she migrates to Facebook Gaming. In August 2021, she participated in Tortillaland, a Minecraft content series hosted by AuronPlay. On September 10, 2021, she returns to Twitch.

In April 2022, he participated in the Cero Albañiles construction-free Fortnite content series, hosted by TheGrefg. In June 2022, she was invited to the La Velada del Año 2 boxing event hosted by Ibai Llanos, where she became champion. That same month she also presented a limited clothing collection together with El Rubius, under the name of MadKat X Ari Gameplays, and appeared in the third edition of the Dame la Pasta Twitch event, hosted by Ibai Llanos. In July 2022, she launched her own clothing collection in collaboration with Shein company. In August 2022, she participated in Tortillaland 2 sequel. In October 2022, she was announced as the face of Razer's Kraken Kitty V2 Pro headset.

Personal life 
On October 5, 2019, she married Colombian streamer Juan Sebastián Guarnizo "JuanSGuarnizo".

Controversies 
In January 2019, she became involved in a controversy with the Panamanian streamer Windy Girk, since she accused her of "doing stream sniping" to harm her on a Fortnite server in which they had coincided. In March 2021, Windy Girk accused her again of "using bots to report her social media", deleting her posts, videos, and streams, according to her.

Awards and nominations

References 

Living people
1998 births
People from Ciudad Juárez
Twitch (service) streamers
Mexican YouTubers
Mexican TikTokers
OnlyFans creators
Glamour models
Gaming YouTubers
YouTube vloggers
Cosplayers